Tom Jenkins (August 3, 1872 – June 19, 1957) was an American professional wrestler who held the American Heavyweight Championship three times around the turn of the 20th century. On May 4, 1905 at Madison Square Garden he wrestled for the newly created World Catch-as-Catch-Can Championship, but lost to George Hackenschmidt. He later taught at the United States Military Academy at West Point (1905–1942) and from 1912 to 1943 he also taught wrestling and boxing at the New York Military Academy at Cornwall-on-Hudson, New York.

Championships and accomplishments

Professional wrestling
George Tragos/Lou Thesz Professional Wrestling Hall of Fame
Class of 2006
International Professional Wrestling Hall of Fame
Class of 2022
Professional Wrestling Hall of Fame and Museum
Pioneer Era (2008)
Wrestling Observer Newsletter Hall of Fame 
Class of 1996
Other championships
American Heavyweight Championship (3 times)

See also

American Heavyweight Championship
Frank Gotch
Farmer Burns

References

External links
Tom Jenkins from the IWIM Website
American Heavyweight Title History
Cited with Frank Gotch on Encyclopædia Britannica Online

Who's Who of Sports Champions by Ralph Hickok.  Published by Houghton Mifflin Company—Jenkins is mentioned in an article about Frank Gotch

1872 births
1957 deaths
American catch wrestlers
American male professional wrestlers
People associated with physical culture
Professional Wrestling Hall of Fame and Museum
Professional wrestlers from Ohio
People from Bedford, Ohio
Sportspeople from Cuyahoga County, Ohio
Army Black Knights wrestling coaches
College boxing coaches in the United States